Sánchez is a district of the Curridabat canton, in the San José province of Costa Rica.

Geography 
Sánchez has an area of  km² and an elevation of  metres.

Demographics 

For the 2011 census, Sánchez had a population of  inhabitants.

Transportation

Road transportation 
The district is covered by the following road routes:
 National Route 2
 National Route 221
 National Route 251
 National Route 252

Rail transportation 
The Interurbano Line operated by Incofer goes through this district.

References 

Districts of San José Province
Populated places in San José Province